The Indian Institute of Corporate Affairs (IICA) is a central civil service training institute under the jurisdiction of Ministry of Corporate Affairs, Government of India for the central civil servants of the Indian Corporate Law Service cadre. Handling and dealing with various subjects, matters and affairs in the arena and spectrum of corporate affairs regulation, governance and policy. It was established in 2008 at Manesar, Haryana. It is the sole institution in the country that has been authorised by Insolvency and Bankruptcy Board of India to run its flagship Graduate Insolvency Program. It gives policy support to government for CSR and organises various training program in CSR. It also provides various services to Corporates for CSR including Impact Assessment, Need Assessment, Baseline survey, Real time monitoring etc.

It also houses the training academy of top cadre of Indian Corporate Law Service. ICLS is an organised Group A service, recruited through All India Civil Service Examination. ICLS officers are posted across the length and breadth of Country in various line and Staff capacities.

IICA operates through various Schools and Centres. It has School of Corporate Law, School of Competition Law and Market Regulations, School of Corporate Governance and Public Policy, School of Finance. It has Centre for Business Innovation, Centre for Insolvency and Bankruptcy, Centre for Environment and Sustainable development.

IICA works and operates to deliver as well as create avenues and opportunities for research, education, training and advocacy.

History and establishment
The Ministry of Corporate Affairs in India had established the Indian Institute of Corporate Affairs (IICA) to function as a think tank, action research, service delivery and capacity building support to the Ministry, corporate sector, professionals and related stakeholders.

Organisation and administration
The Institute is headed by the Director General. It has various Schools, Centres, Departments, Academies and Foundations under its ambit looking after different specialized disciplines and areas within the entire gamut of Corporate Affairs horizon.

In December 2021, Govt of India approved the appointment of Praveen Kumar, Retd IAS officer (TN:1987), Former Secretary, Ministry of Skill Development & Entrepreneurship to the post of Director General & Chief Executive Officer (DG & CEO), Indian Institute of Corporate Affairs (IICA).

Areas of work
IICA is providing support to the Ministry in review/revision of existing corporate laws, rule and regulations, as well as in framing of new ones, as per requirements of a dynamic economic environment. In addition, it is providing training to Indian Company Law Service (ICLS) and other officials working for the Ministry, and supporting organizational reform initiatives. IICA is also helping in continuous improvement of service delivery in diverse areas like MCA21, corporate governance, corporate social responsibility, investor education and protection, etc. The institute is promoting and encouraging innovation and entrepreneurship, particularly in small and medium enterprise. It is providing quality action research, consultancy and information services/support to all its stakeholders including the Government, companies, professionals, Directors of companies, investors, etc. IICA is helping develop and maintain a knowledge Management system, covering all aspects, issues, experiences relating to Indian and global corporate functioning/affairs, linked to internal and external information with speed and in formats designed for ease of access, navigation and utilization. The Institute will provide comprehensive coverage of all disciplines/subjects involved in, or impacting on, corporate functioning. The mandates for IICA mentioned above are not exhaustive.

The Indian Corporate Law Service(ICLS) Academy, one of the Wings of IICA, has been mandated for conducting the Induction & Advanced Training for probationary Officers (POs) belonging to the Indian Corporate Law Service recruited through the Common Exam of Civil Services Examination conducted by UPSC.

Other Key activities carried out by IICA include capacity-building and training programmes, policy advisory functions, public outreach and stakeholder consultations through seminars, conferences and forums.

It also handles matters related to Corporate Social Responsibility as enshrined in the Companies Act 2013. IICA has also been mandated to handle the functioning of National Foundation for Corporate Social Responsibility, a program started by the Government of India in consultation with various stakeholders.

See also
 Ministry of Corporate Affairs
 Serious Fraud Investigation Office
 Competition Commission of India
 National Company Law Tribunal
 Registrar of Companies

References

External links

 
Corporate governance in India
2012 establishments in India